Puncturella fastigiata is a species of sea snail, a marine gastropod mollusk in the family Fissurellidae, the keyhole limpets and slit limpets.

Habitat
This species is found in the following habitats:
 Brackish
 Marine

References

 Liu, J.Y. [Ruiyu] (ed.). (2008). Checklist of marine biota of China seas. China Science Press. 1267 pp.

External links
 To Biodiversity Heritage Library (7 publications)
 To World Register of Marine Species
 Adams, A. (1853). Adams, A. 1853. A monograph of Puncturella, a genus of gasteropodous Mollusca belonging to the family Fissurellidae. Proceedings of the Zoological Society of London. Proceedings of the Zoological Society of London. 9 
 Kantor Yu.I. & Sysoev A.V. (2006) Marine and brackish water Gastropoda of Russia and adjacent countries: an illustrated catalogue. Moscow: KMK Scientific Press. 372 pp. + 140 pls
 Thiele, J. (1912-1919). Scissurelliden und Fissurelliden. In: Systematisches Conchylien-Cabinet von Martini und Chemnitz, 2nd ed. (Küster H.C., ed.). 2(4a)
 Adams, A. & Sowerby, G. B. II. (1863). Monograph of the genera Cemoria, Cranopsis, Zeidora, Rimula, Emarginula, Scutus and Tugalia. In G. B. Sowerby II (ed.), Thesaurus conchyliorum, or monographs of genera of shells. Vol. 3 (22): 207–226, pls 10–14. London, privately published

Fissurellidae
Gastropods described in 1853